Where Did Our Love Go is the second studio album by Motown singing group the Supremes, released in 1964. The album includes several of the group's singles and B-sides from 1963 and 1964. Included are the group's first Billboard Pop Singles number-one hits, "Where Did Our Love Go", "Baby Love", and "Come See About Me", as well as their first Top 40 hit, "When the Lovelight Starts Shining Through His Eyes", and the singles "A Breathtaking Guy" and "Run, Run, Run".

With the release of this album, The Supremes became the first act in Billboard magazine history to have three number-one hits from the same album. It was the album that introduced "The Motown Sound" to the masses.  It was also, at the time, the highest-ranking album by an all-female group. It remained in the number two position for four consecutive weeks in January 1965, shut out of the top spot by the Beatles' blockbuster Beatles '65 album. Where Did Our Love Go remained on the Billboard album chart for an unprecedented 89 weeks.

Hip-O Select released a limited run fortieth anniversary deluxe edition of the album in 2004, which included both the mono and stereo versions of the album, as well as several outtakes, non-album tracks and a recorded live show from the Twenty Grand club in Detroit, Michigan. It sold out immediately.

They filmed performances of four of the singles from the album including "Run, Run, Run",  "When the Lovelight Starts Shining Through His Eyes", "Where Did Our Love Go" and "Baby Love" for the concert film, The T.A.M.I. Show released on December 29, 1964. It was equivalent to Motown 25 or Live Aid as a pivotal music concert event. When it hit theaters nationwide, it undoubtedly raised and extended the visibility of the Where Did Our Love Go album.

Track listing
All tracks written by Holland–Dozier–Holland except as noted.

Side one
"Where Did Our Love Go" - 2:33
"Run, Run, Run" - 2:16
"Baby Love" - 2:39
"When the Lovelight Starts Shining Through His Eyes" - 3:05
"Come See About Me" - 2:44
"Long Gone Lover" (Smokey Robinson) - 2:27

Side two
"I'm Giving You Your Freedom" - 2:40
"A Breathtaking Guy" (Robinson) - 2:25
"He Means the World to Me" (Norman Whitfield) - 2:00
"Standing at the Crossroads of Love" - 2:27
"Your Kiss of Fire" (Robert Gordy, Harvey Fuqua) - 2:48
"Ask Any Girl" - 3:00

2004 Expanded CD bonus tracklist
 "This Is It" (Faye Hale) ****
 "I'm The Exception To The Rule" (Whitfield) **
 "Everyday I'll Love You More Than Yesterday" (Robinson, Claudette Rogers Robinson) *
 "Beginning To The Ending" (George Fowler) *****
 "Mr. Blues" (Robinson) *
 "Come On Boy" (Berry Gordy, Jr.) ***
 "Bye Baby" (Gordy) ***
 "My Imagination" (Richard Parker, Faye Hale) ****
 "I Idolize You" (Robinson) *
 "You're Gonna Come To Me" (Gordy) (Version 4 - Credited as Version "3")
 "Honey Babe" (Gordy, Stevie Wonder) ***
 "Penny Pincher"
 "Let Me Hear You Say (I Love You)" (Andre Williams, Johnny Bristol) ********
 "Don't Take It Away" (William Weatherspoon, William "Mickey" Stevenson) *******
 "Just Call Me" (Ivy Jo Hunter, Stevenson) ******
 "That's A Funny Way" (Hunter, Stevenson) ******
 "Stop, Look & Listen" (Ed Cobb) ***
 "Send Me No Flowers"
 "Baby Love" (Alternate "early" version)
 "Introduction/Devil's Den" (Live (Live 1964)
 "When The Lovelight Starts Shining Through His Eyes" (Live 1964)
 "A Breathtaking Guy" (Live 1964)
 "Your Heart Belongs To Me" (Live 1964)
 "Let Me Go The Right Way" (Live 1964)
 "I Am Woman, You Are Man" (Jule Styne, Bob Merrill) (Live 1964)
 "People" (Merrill, Styne) (Live 1964)
 "Where Did Our Love Go" (Live 1964)

Personnel
 Diana Ross, Florence Ballard, and Mary Wilson - lead and background vocals
 The Four Tops, and Holland–Dozier–Holland - background vocals on "When the Lovelight Starts Shining Through His Eyes", "Run, Run, Run" and "Penny Pincher"
 The Love-Tones - background vocals on "Standing on the Crossroads of Love", "This Is It" and "My Imagination"
 Brian Holland, Lamont Dozier - producers on all tracks except noted below
 Smokey Robinson - producer on "Long Gone Lover" and "A Breathtaking Guy" (and bonus track *)
 Norman Whitfield - producer on "He Means the World to Me" (and bonus track **)
 Robert Gordy - producer on "Your Kiss of Fire"
 Berry Gordy, Jr. - producer on bonus track ***
 Faye Hale - producer on bonus track ****
 George Fowler - producer on bonus track *****
 Ivy Jo Hunter, William "Mickey" Stevenson - producer on bonus track ******
 William "Mickey" Stevenson - producer on bonus track *******
 Andre Williams - producer on bonus track ********
 The Funk Brothers - instrumentation
Earl Van Dyke – piano on "Where Did Our Love Go", "Baby Love" and "Come See About Me"
Robert White – guitar on "Where Did Our Love Go"
Eddie Willis – guitar on "Where Did Our Love Go" and "Baby Love"
Joe Messina – guitar on "Come See About Me"
James Jamerson – bass on "Where Did Our Love Go", "Baby Love" and "Come See About Me"
Richard "Pistol" Allen – drums on "Where Did Our Love Go" and "Baby Love"
Uriel Jones – drums on "Come See About Me"
Jack Ashford – vibraphone on "Where Did Our Love Go", "Baby Love" and "Come See About Me"
Andrew "Mike" Terry – baritone saxophone on "Where Did Our Love Go", "Baby Love" and "Come See About Me"
Hank Cosby – tenor saxophone on "Baby Love" and "Come See About Me"
Mike Valvano – footstomps on "Where Did Our Love Go", "Baby Love" and "Come See About Me"
 Bernard Yeszin, Wallace Mead - cover design

Singles history
"A Breath Taking, First Sight Soul Shaking, One Night Love Making, Next Day Heart Breaking Guy" b/w "(The Man with the) Rock And Roll Banjo Band" (from The Supremes Sing Country, Western and Pop) (Motown 1044, June 12, 1963, reissued immediately with A-side title shortened to "A Breath Taking Guy")
"When The Lovelight Starts Shining Through His Eyes" b/w "Standing at the Crossroads of Love" (Motown 1051, October 31, 1963)
"Run, Run, Run" b/w "I'm Giving You Your Freedom" (Motown 1054, February 7, 1964)
"Where Did Our Love Go" b/w "He Means the World to Me" (Motown 1060, June 17, 1964)
"Baby Love" b/w "Ask Any Girl" (Motown 1066, September 17, 1964)
"Come See About Me" b/w "You're Gone, But Always in My Heart" (on The Supremes Sing Holland–Dozier–Holland) (Motown 1068, October 27, 1964)

Chart history

Weekly charts

Year-end charts

See also
List of Billboard number-one R&B albums of the 1960s

References

1964 albums
The Supremes albums
Albums produced by Norman Whitfield
Albums produced by Smokey Robinson
Albums produced by Brian Holland
Albums produced by Lamont Dozier
Motown albums
Albums recorded at Hitsville U.S.A.